Shanghai Jiaotong Guangbo is a traffic radio station in Shanghai in the People's Republic of China, broadcasting at both 105.7 FM and 648 AM.  The radio station is part of the Radio and Television Station of Shanghai, whose programmes are made by SMG Radio Centre.

According to the website, this station particularly gives information regarding gas station prices and the state of the Shanghai transportation infrastructure.  Broadcasts are repeated every half-hour.  Towards the evening, flight conditions are reported.

In the evening, this radio station is a rebroadcast of Shanghai TV news.

External links
 Shanghai Jiao Tong Tai Official website

Radio stations in China
Shanghai Media Group